Hideaway Bay, also spelled Hydeaway Bay, is a coastal town and locality in the Whitsunday Region, Queensland, Australia.

Geography 
There is a long sandy beach along the coastline with Shoal Bay off the coast . The locality is accessed via Hydeaway Road.

The land use is residential.

History 
The town was officially named on 2 December 1989. The locality was officially named and bounded on 28 January 2000.

Education 
There are no schools in Hideaway Bay. The nearest government primary school is Proserpine State School and the nearest government secondary school is Proserpine State High School, both in Proserpine to the south-east.

Amenities 
Hideaway Bay has a large sports park with a synthetic grass tenniscourt.

Hideaway Bay Bowls Club has a two-rink bowling green under cover and a club house. at 417 Hydeaway Bay Drive.

References 

Towns in Queensland
Whitsunday Region
Coastline of Queensland
Localities in Queensland